Yersin may refer to:

People
Alexander Yersin (entomologist) (1825–1863), Swiss entomologist
Alexandre Yersin (1863–1943), Swiss and French physician and bacteriologist
Yves Yersin (1942–2018), Swiss film director

Other
Lycée français Alexandre Yersin (LFAY), French international school in Long Bien District, Hanoi, Vietnam
Lycée Yersin, a school in Da Lat, Vietnam, to educate the children of French colonialists and upper class Vietnamese.  After various changes, it is now the Pedagogical College of Da Lat
Yersin Museum, a museum in Nha Trang, Vietnam, dedicated to Alexandre Yersin the bacteriologist